Gary M. Reho (born August 17, 1953) is an American former college football coach. He was the first head coach in Sacred Heart University history. Reho served from 1991 through 1996 and compiled an overall record of 19–38. During his tenure, Reho oversaw the Pioneers transition from NCAA Division III, in 1991 and 1992, to NCAA Division II in 1993. While the first four years of Pioneers football were independent of any athletics conference, during the final two year of Reho's tenure the team competed in the Eastern Collegiate Football Conference.

Head coaching record

College

References

1953 births
Living people
Sacred Heart Pioneers football coaches
Springfield Pride football players
High school football coaches in Massachusetts